Puig de Randa is a mountain in the island of Majorca, Balearic Islands, Spain. It is included in the municipal territory of  Algaida, and, on its top, is home to the Sanctuary of Cura.

The Puig de Randa is the place where Ramon Llull went to do penance after his conversion.

See also
Ramon Llull

References 

Mountains of the Balearic Islands